is a 1986 Japanese film directed by Kei Kumai and based on a novel of the same name by Shusaku Endo. It tells the true story of downed American pilots in World War II who are vivisected by Japanese surgeons in medical experiments.

The film has never been released on home video outside of Japan and has never been released with an English translation. Unofficial translations exist online and can be legally watched with an original Japanese DVD using computer software that allows custom subtitles.

Cast 
 Eiji Okuda as Suguro
 Ken Watanabe as Toda
 Takahiro Tamura as Professor Hashimoto
 Kyōko Kishida as Ohba, Head Nurse
 Mikio Narita as Shibata
 Shigeru Kōyama as Gondo
 Toshie Negishi as Ueda, Nurse
 Ken Nishida as Asai
 Masumi Okada as Hattori
 Noriko Sengoku as Old woman
  as Murai
 Masane Tsukayama as Miyasaka

Awards 
37th Berlin International Film Festival
 Jury Grand Prix
41st Mainichi Film Award
 Best Film

References

External links
 

1986 films
1986 drama films
1980s Japanese-language films
Japanese black-and-white films
Films based on Japanese novels
Films based on works by Shūsaku Endō
Pacific War films
Japanese war drama films
Films about war crimes
Films directed by Kei Kumai
Best Film Kinema Junpo Award winners
Silver Bear Grand Jury Prize winners
Japanese World War II films
1980s Japanese films